Roland Lionel Raymond (12 January 1899 – 29 January 1964) was a rugby union player who represented Australia.

Raymond, a wing, claimed a total of 13 international rugby caps for Australia.

References

                   

Australian rugby union players
Australia international rugby union players
People educated at Sydney Grammar School
1899 births
1964 deaths
Rugby union wings